Hepzibah, West Virginia may refer to:
Hepzibah, Harrison County, West Virginia, an unincorporated community in Harrison County
Hepzibah, Taylor County, West Virginia, an unincorporated community in Taylor County